Colorado Amendment C (also known as the Charitable Bingo and Raffles Amendment) was a 2020 referendum to amend Section 2 of Article XVIII of the Colorado Constitution. The amendment would have changed the rules governing the conduct of charitable gaming activities (bingo, pull-tab games, and raffles). The amendment failed because it did not receive the 55% of the valid vote required to add to the Constitution.

Contents 
The amendment appeared on the ballot as follows:

Support and Opposition 
The amendment was supported by the Colorado Charitable Gaming Association. Boulder Weekly, The Vail Daily, The Durango Herald, The Steamboat Pilot & Today, and The Journal-Advocate and The Fort Morgan Times ran editorials in support of the amendment. 

The Colorado Springs Indy ran an editorial in opposition of the amendment.

Results

References 

2020 referendums
Referendums in the United States